Billy Brooks (born 15 February 2004) is an Irish professional footballer who plays as a forward for Lincoln City.

Club career

Lincoln City
Brooks was offered an early Lincoln City scholarship at U16 level, along with Hayden Cann. He would make his Lincoln City debut against Manchester United U21 in the EFL Trophy on 24 August 2021 coming off the bench. He would join Gainsborough Trinity on a work experience loan on 18 September 2021.

International career
He would be called up to the Republic of Ireland U18 team for the first time on 15 August 2021 and would make his international debut just two days later, coming off the bench against Hungary U18.

Career statistics

References 

Living people
Lincoln City F.C. players
Association football forwards
2004 births
Republic of Ireland association footballers